Paliyath Jayachandrakuttan is an Indian playback singer and actor from Kerala. Jayachandran is best known for his captivating voice which gave him the title Bhava Gayakan by the music fraternity of South India. He has worked with many composers including G. Devarajan, M. S. Baburaj, V. Dakshinamoorthy, K. Raghavan, M. K. Arjunan, M. S. Viswanathan, Ilaiyaraaja, Koti, Shyam, A. R. Rahman, M. M. Keeravani, Vidyasagar and M Jayachandran. He has sung more than 10000 songs in total in different languages.He also acted in few films too.

In 1986, he won the National Film Award for Best Male Playback Singer and also won Kerala State Film Award five times. In 2020, he was awarded the J. C. Daniel Award, the highest award in Malayalam cinema, for his outstanding contributions to Malayalam cinema.He is widely regarded as the one of the greatest expression singer in South India. He also won 2 Tamil Nadu state film awards .

Early life
Jayachandran was born in Bhadralayam at Ravipuram, Kochi on 3 March 1944 and his family later moved to Irinjalakuda. He is the third of five children of the late Ravivarma Kochaniyan Thampuran, a member of Cochin royal family, who was himself a musician, though never a professional singer and the late Paliyath Subhadrakkunjamma, and also the second of their three sons. His siblings (11lKrishnakumar (b. 1946) Jayanthi (b. 1949).

Jayachandran married Lalitha from Thrissur in May 1973. They have a daughter named Lakshmi and a son named Dinanath, who also sang for films.

Career
Jayachandran graduated from Christ College, Irinjalakuda. He was a student of the National High School, Irinjalakuda from where he received many prizes for playing the mridangam and light music in the State School Youth Festival. Jayachandran met Yesudas in 1958 when he participated in the state youth festival. Yesudas won the Best Classical Singer award and Jayachandran got the best mridamgist award in the same year.

Jayachandran has won one National Award, five Kerala State Awards and four Tamil Nadu State Awards. He has recorded songs in Malayalam, Tamil, Kannada, Telugu and Hindi.

In 1967, he sang the evergreen song "Anuragaganam pole", composed by M.S. Baburaj, for the film Udhyogastha, directed by P. Venu. Later together, P. Venu and Jayachandran produced more hits like "Ninmaniarayile" C.I.D. Nazir 1971 and "Malayala Bashathan" Prethangalude Thazhvara 1973. Jayachandran received the Kerala State Film Award for Best Singer in 1972 for the song "Neelagiriyude ('Suprabhaatham')" for the film Panitheeratha Veedu. Its music was done by M. S. Viswanathan. The year 1978 brought him another Kerala State award, this time for the song "Ragam Sreeragam" from the film Bandhanam, composed by M. B. Sreenivasan. In 1985 he received the National Film Award for Best Male Playback Singer for the song "Sivasankara Sarva Saranya Vibho" from the film Sree Narayana Guru, composed by G. Devarajan . The song "Prayam Nammil", from the film Niram, brought him a third Kerala state award in 1998. In 2015 he received the next state award for his songs in Jilebi and Ennu ninte Moideen 46th Kerala State Film Awards.In 1975, he sang for the Malayalam movie Penpada (with music by R. K. Shekhar) a song called "Velli then Kinnam Pol", regarded as the first composition of the then 9-year-old Dileep Shekhar, now more widely known as A. R. Rahman.

Jayachandran worked in close collaboration with the composer Ilayaraja, producing numerous popular hits in the Tamil language, including "Raasaathi Unna", "Kaathirundhu Kaathirundhu" (both from the 1984 release Vaidhegi kaathirundhaal), "Mayanginen Solla Thayanginen" (from the 1985 release Naaney raaja naaney mandhiri), "Vaalkaiye Vesham" (from the 1979 release Aarilirundhu Arubathu Varai), "Poova Eduthu Oru" (from the 1986 release Amman Kovil Kizhakaaley) and "Thaalaattudhey Vaanam" (from the 1981 release Kadal Meengal). In 1994, he received the Tamil Nadu State Film Award for Best Singer for the song "Kathazham Kattuvazhi" for the film Kizhakku Cheemayile, composed by A. R. Rahman. As a recognition for his contribution to Tamil film music, he was honoured with the 1997 Kalaimamani award of the Tamil Nadu Government.

Jayachandran was honoured with the Swaralaya Kairali Yesudas award at the beginning of 2001, which he was the first person to receive. The motive behind this award is to choose the best from the singers and lyricists within a span of 30 years. He has sung nearly 1000 songs for Malayalam movies over the years, according to the MSI information database.

Jayachandran sang in Hindi for the first time in 2008 for the movie ADA...A Way of Life along with Alka Yagnik, with music scored by A. R. Rahman.

Discography

Tamil Songs

Tamil Christian Devotional Songs
 "Uravodu Vaazhum" – Deiva Tharisanam
 "Nanbanukkaga" – Deiva Tharisanam
 "Amaidhiyin Thoothanay" –  
 "Enathu Vizhiyil Unathu Paarvai" –  
 "Amaithi Thedi Alaiyum Nenjame" – Paathai

Malayalam
 "Manjalayil Mungi Thorthi" – Kalithozhan (Malayalam)
 "Therirangum Mukile" – Mazhathullikilukkam (Malayalam)
 "Ammaye Orakanta" - Neetho Cheppalani (Telugu)
 "Olanjali Kuruvi" – 1983 (Malayalam)
 "Ithaloornnu Veena" – Thanmathra (Malayalam)
 "Harshbashpam Thooki" - "Muthassi"(Malayalam)
 "Ariyathe Ariyathe" - "Ravanaprabhu" (Malayalam)
 ""Pattil Ee Pattil" - "Pranayam"  (Malayalam)
 "Sharadambaram " - "Ennu Ninte Moideen"  (Malayalam)
 "Mannappm chuttu" - Marubhoomiyile Aana (Malayalam)
 "Podi meesha" - Pa Va (Malayalam)
 "Neeyoru Puzhayayi"- Thilakkam (Malayalam)
 "Poove Poove" - "Devadoothan" (Malayalam)
 "Aaru Paranju" - "Pulival Kalyanam" (Malayalam)
 "Mazhavannu" - Puzhikkadakan (Malayalam)
 "Kalabhachuvaru Vecha Meda" - Aval Oru Thudar Katha (Malayalam)

Kannada songs
 "Hindusthanvu endu mareyada" - Amrutha Ghalige (Kannada)
 "Olavina Udugore Kodalenu" – Olavina Udugore (Kannada)
 "Mandara Pushpavu Neenu" - Ranganayaki (Kannada)
 "Chanda Chanda" - Maanasa Sarovara (Kannada)
 "Jeevana Sanjeevana" - Hanthakana Sanchu (Kannada)
 "Kamala Nayana Kamala Vadhana" – Bhaktha Prahladha (Kannada)

Malayalam music albums
 Pranayamarmaram – 2009.

Hindi songs
 "Milo Wahan Wahan (from movie ADA, Debut song in Hindi)

Telugu Discography

Filmography as actor
.Nakashatangal- As Neighbour- Directed by Hariharan 

.Travandrum Lodge -As Narayanan Nair- Directed by VK Prakash

Awards
National Film Awards
 1986 – Best Male Play Back Singer for the Malayalam film Sree Narayana Guru
 Special national film award mention honour in 1972 for Neelagiriyude Sakhikale

Kerala State Film Awards
 1972 – Best Male Play Back Singer for the song "Suprabhatham" in the film Pani Theeratha Veedu
 1978 – Best Male Play Back Singer for the song "Ragam Sreeragam" in the film Bandhanam
 1999 – Best Male Play Back Singer for the song "Prayam Nammil" in the film Niram
 2004 – Best Male Play Back Singer for the song "Neeyoru Puzhayaay" in the film Thilakkam
 2015 – Best Male Play Back Singer for the songs "Njaan Oru Malayali", "Malarvaka Kombathu", "Sharadambaram" in the films Jilebi, Ennum Eppozhum, Ennu Ninte Moideen
 2020 – J. C. Daniel Award for his outstanding contributions to Malayalam cinema

Tamil Nadu State Film Awards
 1994 – Best Male Playback Singer – for the song "Kattazham Kattuvazhi" in the film Kizhakku Cheemayile
 1997 – Kalaimamani award by Tamil Nadu Government for 30 Years in Tamil Film Music
Asianet Film Awards
 2001 – Best Male Playback – Raavanaprabhu
 1999 – Best Male Playback – Niram
Other awards
 2000 – Swaralaya Kairali Yesudas Award
 2011 – Kamukara Award
 2014 – Harivarasanam Award
 2015 – Kerala Film Critics Association Award for Best Male Playback Singer - Sharadambaram (Ennu Ninte Moideen)
 2017 – Mazhavil Mango Music Award for Best Singer - Podimeesha (Pa Va)

References

External links
 

1942 births
Living people
Best Male Playback Singer National Film Award winners
Kerala State Film Award winners
Indian male playback singers
Tamil Nadu State Film Awards winners
Recipients of the Kalaimamani Award
Singers from Kerala
Tamil playback singers
Malayalam playback singers
Kannada playback singers
Telugu playback singers
Malayali people
People from Irinjalakuda
Film musicians from Kerala
20th-century Indian singers
21st-century Indian singers
20th-century Indian male singers
21st-century Indian male singers